The Miskolc Metropolitan Area is a metropolitan area in Northern Hungary . The agglomeration consists of 13 municipalities: 4 cities 2 "big" villages and 7 villages . It has a population of 205.626  (2012).( This is Hungary's second most populous agglomeration after the Budapest agglomeration ) . Area :  , The population density 466,4/km2  was in 2012 . For the county's population 30% lives in this agglomeration.

Settlements of the Miskolc metropolitan area

 Alsózsolca (city)
 Arnót (village)
 Felsőzsolca (city)
 Kistokaj (village)
 Mályi (village)
 Miskolc (county seat, regional city)
 Onga ("big" village)
 Sajóbábony (city)
 Sajóecseg (village)
 Sajókeresztúr (village)
 Sajópálfala (village)
 Sajóvámos (village)
 Szirmabesenyő ("big" village)

Data

References

Miskolc
Geography of Borsod-Abaúj-Zemplén County